Kevin Reagan is a three-time Grammy Award-winning graphic designer/art director, also honored by the AIGA, Print, and Communication Arts. He has created artwork for critically and commercially acclaimed albums by Madonna, The Foo Fighters, Beck, Dixie Chicks, Guns N' Roses, Europe, Meshell Ndegeocello, Alanis Morissette, Pat Metheny, Svoy, Sonic Youth, among numerous other notable artists. At various times, Reagan has been the art director for Maverick Records, MCA Records and Geffen Records. He is the author of Alex Steinweiss, The Inventor of the Modern Album Cover (2009, Taschen).

References

Living people
American graphic designers
Year of birth missing (living people)